Omar Belatoui (born 6 April 1969 in Oran) is an Algerian football manager, former international playerand the current head coach of MC Oran.

He was capped 31 times for Algeria.

Honours

Club
 Won the Algerian league twice with MC Oran in 1988 and 1993
 Won the Algerian Cup with MC Oran in 1996
 Won the Algerian League Cup with MC Oran in 1996
 Won the Arab Cup Winners Cup twice with MC Oran in 1997 and 1998
 Won the Arab Super Cup once with MC Oran in 1999
 Finalist of the African Cup of Champions Clubs once with MC Oran in 1989
 Finalist of the Arab Champions League once with MC Oran in 2001

National
 Won the 1991 Afro-Asian Cup of Nations

References

External links
 Omar Belatoui statistics - dzfootball
 Omar Belatoui at Footballdatabase
 

1969 births
Living people
Footballers from Oran
Algerian footballers
Algeria international footballers
MC Oran players
ASM Oran players
Association football defenders
1992 African Cup of Nations players
1996 African Cup of Nations players
Algerian football managers
MC Oran managers
RC Relizane managers
USM Oran managers
WA Tlemcen managers
US Biskra managers
DRB Tadjenanet managers
CR Témouchent managers
21st-century Algerian people